Ko Young-tae (born 1976) is a South Korean businessman and fencer. He competed in the individual and team sabre events at the 1998 Asian Games.

Ko was a close friend of Choi Soon-sil. Ko is suspected of being involved in the management of The Blue K, Widec Sports, and paper companies. Choi set up these companies in Korea and Germany allegedly to funnel money from the foundations.

He became one of the figures in the 2016 South Korean political scandal, and has been described as a whistleblower. He disclosed a documentary showing that his neighbors tried to steal the money from the Mir and the Blue K Foundation by using Choi Soon Shin.

See also
Host club

References

People associated with the 2016 South Korean political scandal
South Korean businesspeople
South Korean male foil fencers
Fencers at the 1998 Asian Games
Asian Games medalists in fencing
Asian Games gold medalists for South Korea
Asian Games silver medalists for South Korea
Korea National Sport University alumni
Sportspeople from Gwangju
1976 births
Living people
South Korean whistleblowers
Medalists at the 1998 Asian Games